The 1975 Phonogram World Masters was the major tournament on the BDO/WDF calendar for 1975. It took place from 1 October at the West Centre Hotel, Fulham.

The tournament featured the best 60 players from around the world. 24 winners of major tournaments from the last year and an English qualifying round consisting of 36 players (2 from each county). The 36 County players played down to a last 8 before joining the 24 invitees to make the first round.

The final was an all Welsh affair between Alan Evans and David "Rocky" Jones with Evans winning his only World Masters title.

This tournament is notable for being the first major tournament entered by a then 18 year old Eric Bristow, who went on to dominate the game in the 1980s. Bristow failed to make the last 32 after losing in the England qualifiers earlier in the day.

Prize money
Total Prize fund was £2000
Champion £1000 and a HiFi
Runner-up £500
Third £200
4th £100
Quarter finalists £50

Qualifiers

International Qualifiers
 Maurice Maenhout
 Nicky Virachkul
 Preben Schultz
 Erik Christensen
 Joe Goldwin
 George Cottle
 Harry Ellis
 Douglas Melander
 Stefan Lord
 Jack McKenna
 Jim McQuillan
 Garter Goodridge
 William Greenhough
 Neil Campbell-Adams
 David Baille
 Harry Heenan - 1974 World Master Runner-Up
 Jack North - N.D.A.G.B. Champion
 Alan Evans - British Open Champion
 Leighton Rees - 1974The Indoor League Champion
 Ron Church - Inter City Track Arrows
 Derek White - 1974 News of The World Champion
 David "Rocky" Jones - Unicorn Pairs Champion
 Ray Phillips - Unicorn Pairs Champion
 Cliff Inglis - 1974 World Master

English Qualifiers
Lee Griffith - Sussex
Brian Smart - Sussex
Terry Harrison - Cleveland
Jack Brown - Cleveland
Barry Caldicott - Warwickshire
Paul Tunley - Warwickshire
Dennis Kilbourne - Northants
Wally Burton - Northants
Cyril Hayes - West
Alf Jefferies - West
Lionel Johns - Cornwall
Ron Burley - Cornwall
Eric Bristow - London
Peter Chapman - London
Tony Johnson - Surrey
George Lee - Surrey
Lew Walker - Kent
Ian Glennie - Kent
Nobby Clark- Lancashire
Bill Leonard - Lancashire
Peter Horrobin - Cheshire
George Walsh - Cheshire
Des Stabb - Devon
George Murphy - Devon
Peter Spurdle - Somerset
Les Cornall - Somerset
Roy Williams - Thames Valley
Sam Sherwood - Thames Valley
Ron Miller - Herts
Maurice Young - Herts
Dennis Sharp - Bedfordshire
Chris Garner - Bedfordshire
Alex Hancock - Staffordshire
Bob Lightfood - Staffordshire
John Craine - Isle Of Man
Dougy Caley - Isle of Man

The results

References
All results and references taken from World Masters Programme.

World Masters (darts)
World Masters
World Masters (darts)